Khafr is a village in Karkas Rural District, in the Central District of Natanz County, Isfahan Province, Iran. At the 2006 census, its population was 185, in 92 families.

References 

Populated places in Natanz County